Uwe Franz is an East German retired slalom canoeist who competed in the late 1960s and the early 1970s. He won three medals at the ICF Canoe Slalom World Championships with a gold (C-2 team: 1971) and two bronzes (C-2: 1971, Mixed C-2: 1967).

References

German male canoeists
Living people
Year of birth missing (living people)
Medalists at the ICF Canoe Slalom World Championships